Hadžići is a town and municipality in Sarajevo Canton of the Federation of Bosnia and Herzegovina

It may also refer to:

Hadžići, Novi Travnik, a village in Novi Travnik municipality
Hadžići, Visoko, a village in Visoko municipality
Hadžići (Ilijaš), a village in Ilijaš municipality
Hadžići (Goražde), a village in Goražde municipality
Hadžići (Ključ), a village in Ključ municipality